Hans Klodt (10 June 1914 – 7 November 1996) was a German football player. He was the older brother of Bernhard Klodt. He was born in Gelsenkirchen.,

Club career 
Like his brother, he played for FC Schalke 04 where between 1936 and 1948 he stood in goal. In 1937 he won the German Bundesliga as well as the Tschammer Cup. In 1942 and 1943, he was replaced by Heinz Flotho due to a war injury, and thus missed winning the championship in 1942.

His career began not at Schalke 04 but at BV Gelsenkirchen. In 1948, he left Schalke for Beckum, where he played until 1955.

International career 
Between 1938 and 1941 he made a total of 17 appearances for the German national team.

References

External links
 
 

1914 births
1996 deaths
German footballers
FC Schalke 04 players
Association football goalkeepers
Germany international footballers
Sportspeople from Gelsenkirchen
Footballers from North Rhine-Westphalia
West German footballers